Aguleri meaning Agulu nwa Eri (Agulu-Eri). This is because according to their traditional lores, Agulu is the son of Eri. Lawrence Ozeh is an internet entrepreneur, in his essay, he opined that Aguleri is the cradle of Igbo people.

Aguleri is a medium-sized town, located within the Anambra valley in the southeastern quadrant of the Federal Republic of Nigeria, which is a country on the west coast of Africa. Aguleri is the largest town in Anambra North local government area of Anambra State in Nigeria, bordered by Umueri, Anam and Nando in the West, Anaku, Omor, Ifite Ogwari, Igbakwu and Umueje in the East, Iggah, Ojjor, Asaba and Ogwurugwu communities of Uzo Uwani lga in Enugu state in the south, while in North it borders Obele, Odeke, Eshonwa communities of ibaji lga in Kogi state. Census figures  put the population of Aguleri at close to 900,000 people. Aguleri has a landmass of about 380 square kilometers.

The ruling family of Aguleri is Idigo. Their dynasty has lasted over 10 decades. The name of the current king is Dr. Michael Idigo.

History 
Oral tradition history traces the origin of Aguleri to a man named Eri. Eri settled at the bank of the river where he made an altar of onyx at the confluence of Ezu na Omabala rivers. Due to annual flooding of the place Eri moved upland to Eri-aka near odanduli stream and finally to  where he erected Obu Uga (Obu-Gad). Eri had the following children 1. Agulu (Aguleri) 2. Attah 3. Oba 4. Menri 5. Adamgbo (Iguedo the only daughter of Eri). All the children of Eri lived together with their father in Aguleri until after the death of Eri when his sons scattered in different places where they are founder of different kingdoms. Attah the second son of Eri left and founded Igala kingdom while Oba moved to found Benin kingdom. Menri later left Aguleri where he founded Nri kingdom. Eri first son Agulu-eri (Aguleri) remained behind and inherited his father's land and expanded the kingdom. Aguleri married three wives namely Ada, Omali and Eke and had four sons namely 1. Ivite 2. Igboezunu 3. Enugwu. 4. Eziagulu. Note: Ada the first wife did not conceived on time, Agulu (Aguleri) had to marry Omali (second wife) who conceived and bore him a son called Ivite (first son). God remember Ada the first wife of Agulu (Aguleri) and she conceived and bore a son called Igboezunu (second son). Agulu (Aguleri) had to marry the third wife Eke who God blessed with two sons namely Enugwu (third son) and Eziagulu (fourth son). This three wives of Aguleri formed Akwukwonato.

Villages 
Aguleri is currently subdivided into three main quarters: Igboezunu, Ivite, and Enugwu na Eziagulu (Ugwu na adegbe) with component families replicated both in Aguleri Uno and Aguleri Otu.

In the Igbo culture, inheritance of property is based on the order of birth—the first child is always first to choose property. Hence, the villages in Aguleri are: Homeland (Enuobodo), Igboezunu-otu, Ivite-otu, Eziagulu-otu, and Enugu-otu, riverine or Aguleri-otu, located on the lower part of the Omambala.

New settlements called Ndi-Uka (Mbito) which belongs to Egbeagu village in Eziagulu Aguleri, where the early Roman Catholic missionaries first settled before spreading the gospel to hinterland. Today Amaeze (Otuocha), now exists as the urban area of Aguleri.

The Aguleri soil is very fertile. Farmers cultivate different kinds of food crops, both for commercial and subsistence purposes. Aguleri is known as the food basket of Anambra State.

Culture and Festivals 
Aguleri, as a historical city, has many cultural events and places adorned with festivities and cultural monuments, including Agbanabo Ezu na Omabala, Ajana Ukwu, Ugwu Ogodo, Ovilivo sacred spring water, and many other historical sites dotted across all sections of ancient city of Aguleri. Aguleri hosts many festivals, notably amongst them is the Alo Mmuo  (New Yam Festival, also known as Ivejioku festival), Igba Ada festival which all parts of the town participates and various masquerades entertain every body. The Ovalla festival attracts all sorts of activities and celebrations which Aguleri residents hold in the highest esteem. Olili Obibia Eri, is a festival that holds in seventh native month, in celebration of Eri, the father of Aguleri and Igbo race, other festivals includes Uta Oba which is celebrated only by title men, Akwali festival, Oluta Festival and Nzideana festival which is used to mark the end of seasonal flood and user in the new farming season.

In the average home of any Aguleri citizen, they usually keep kola nuts, garden egg and peanut butter in their house in case any stranger or visitor should visit their home. Every visitation to their home begins with the offering of the kola nuts to the visitor. The kola nut is indicating that the visitor is very much welcomed. The ritual of the offering of kola nut is inspired with the giving in prayers and blessing or lobby to the supreme God (Chukwu) and other deities, for the protection of the visitor and the host. It seems to be a custom to the people of Aguleri in any of their traditional ceremonies.
The Ovala festival is a royal festival celebrated on the first Eke market day of the year. It attracts dignitaries from all walks of life. Neighboring village heads also visit to pay homage to the Igwe of Aguleri on this day.

Infrastructure 

Most of the public basic infrastructure in the town is built by the community. The community-built infrastructures are as follow: Ivite Aguleri primary health care, Aguleri Town Hall, St Joseph Memorial high school Aguleri,  Justice Chinwuba memorial secondary school Aguleri, Willie Obiano Secondary school Enugwu Aguleri, Col. Mike Attah Secondary School Aguleri, Postal Agency, Aguleri Community Bank, Nkwo Igboezunu Market, Eke UgwunaAdagbe Market, Good Evening daily market, Enugwu Aguleri, Immaculate heart specialist hospital, Aguleri, Igbo osisi market Aguleri, Building material market Aguleri etc.

The few infrastructure owned by the neighboring community are First Bank Aguleri, Access Bank, Aguleri township stadium, Odene Aguleri Head Bridge, Aguleri High Court and Judges quarters, 54 Squadron Mobile Police Force, Aguleri barracks, Police institute of finance and administration Aguleri, Aguleri Civic Center, Inec Office Aguleri, Aguleri Regional water scheme, Orient  Staff Residential Quarters etc.

Michael Tansi Memorial Secondary School, Aguleri is owned by the Onitsha Archdiocese of the Roman Catholic Mission.

References

 Isichei, Elizabeth Allo (1997). A History of African Societies to 1870 . Cambridge University Press.  .
 Prince R A Chikwenze. Aguleri the pivot of the Bani-Isa'al (the Igbo) in Nigeria.

External links
 
 Aguleri Foundation North America

Populated places in Anambra State